Tabuena is a surname. Notable people with the surname include:

Miguel Tabuena (born 1994), Filipino golfer
Romeo Tabuena (1921-2015), Filipino painter and printmaker